Oleksiy Lazebnyi (born in Chernihiv 6 May 1993) is a Ukrainian footballer who plays as a midfielder.

Career
Oleksiy Lazebnyi was a product of Desna Chernihiv, he started in 2008 in the youth academy SDYuShOR Desna. In 2010 he moved to Skala Stryi in Ukrainian Second League and in 2012 he moved to YSB Chernihiv in Ukrainian Amateur Football Championship. Here in 2012, he won the Chernihiv Oblast Football Cup. In 2014 he moved to Sillamäe Kalev in Estonia, where he got 2nd in Meistriliiga in the season 2014. In summer 2014 he moved to Jõhvi FC Phoenix and then moved to Vranov nad Topľou in 3. Liga in Slovakia, where he got 5th the season season 2014–15 where he played 11 matches.

Honours
YSB Chernihiv
 Chernihiv Oblast Football Cup: 2012

Sillamäe Kalev
 Meistriliiga: Runner-Up 2014

References

External links
 Oleksiy Lazebnyi at footballfacts.ru 
 Oleksiy Lazebnyi at soccerway.com 

1993 births
Living people
Footballers from Chernihiv
Ukrainian footballers
Association football midfielders
SDYuShOR Desna players
FC Chernihiv players
JK Sillamäe Kalev players
MFK Vranov nad Topľou players
Ukrainian Second League players
Ekstraklasa players
3. Liga (Slovakia) players
Expatriate footballers in Estonia
Ukrainian expatriate sportspeople in Estonia
Expatriate footballers in Slovakia
Ukrainian expatriate sportspeople in Slovakia